The Longjiang Dam is an arch dam on the Long River (upper of Shweli River) near Mangshi in Dehong Prefecture of Yunnan Province, China. It is a multiple-purpose project aimed at flood control, irrigation and hydroelectric power generation. The dam's power station is located on its left bank and contains three 80 MW Francis turbine-generators for a total installed capacity if 240 MW. Construction on the project began on 28 November 2006 and all generators were commissioned in 2010.

See also

List of dams and reservoirs in China
List of tallest dams in China

References

Dams in China
Arch dams
Dams completed in 2010
Hydroelectric power stations in Yunnan
Buildings and structures in Dehong Dai and Jingpo Autonomous Prefecture
Energy infrastructure completed in 2010
2010 establishments in China